Sins of the City is an American crime drama television series that aired on USA Network from July 19 to October 17, 1998. While thirteen episodes of the series were produced, only nine episodes were aired before USA Network pulled the show.

Premise
After losing his job on the police force, Vince Karol decides to become a private detective and dig into the seedier side of Miami.

Cast
 Marcus Graham as Vince Karol
 José Zúñiga as Freddie Corillo
 Barbara Williams as Sam Richardson
 Daniel Tosh as DJ Dog Man

Episodes

References

External links
 

1998 American television series debuts
1998 American television series endings
1990s American crime drama television series
English-language television shows
USA Network original programming
Television shows set in Miami